Naschenweng is a German surname. Notable people with the surname include:

 Katharina Naschenweng (born 1997), Austrian footballer
 Melissa Naschenweng (born 1990), Austrian singer and musician

German-language surnames